Leptothyra filifer is a species of sea snail, a marine gastropod mollusk in the family Colloniidae.

Description
The size of the shell varies between 3 mm and 8 mm.

Distribution
This species occurs in the Indian Ocean.

References

 Deshayes, G. P., 1863 Catalogue des mollusques de l‛Ile de la Réunion (Bourbon). In Maillard, L. (Ed.) Notes sur l'Ile de la Réunion (Bourbon), p. 144 p, 14 pls

External links
 

Colloniidae
Gastropods described in 1863